Established in 1870 as the Colombo Medical School, the Faculty of Medicine of the University of Colombo, Sri Lanka, is the second oldest medical school in South Asia.It is considered to be the top most medical faculty in the country which requires the highest entry qualification in GCE Advanced Level examination.

History
In 1839, the Governor of Ceylon J. A. Stewart Mackenzie started sending Ceylonese students to Calcutta for medical studies to the oldest medical school in South Asia - The Bengal Medical College.

In the 1860s the Colonial Surgeon, Dr. James Loos was requested to report on the large depopulation of the Wanni. He recommended that medical facilities should be available throughout the island and to this end a medical school should be opened. The Colombo Medical School was thus opened in 1870 by the then Governor Sir Hercule Robinson. Dr James Loos was its first principal. Dr. E.L.Koch was the second principal in whose memory the Koch Memorial Clock Tower, which still stands, was built in 1881.

The beginnings of the medical school were modest. It was situated in the General Hospital Colombo, and had three teachers and 25 students. It offered a course of three years duration until in 1873 the course was extended to four years. Its progress was rapid. In 1880 the medical school was raised to the status of a college (renamed Ceylon Medical College) and in 1884 the course was extended to 5 years.

In 1875 Mudaliyar Samson Rajapakse gifted three and a half acres of land on which the present Faculty is located. Sir Charles Henry de Soysa, Mudaliyar Susew de Soysa, Muhandiram A.Simon Fernando Wijegooneratne and Mudaliyar Vimala Gunawardana donated the buildings. These buildings are no more and the Anatomy block, built in 1913, is the oldest building now.
In 1887, the Diploma of Licentiate of Medicine and Surgery (LMS) granted by the College became registrable with the General Medical Council (GMC) of the United Kingdom.

The Ceylon Medical College and the Ceylon University College, which had been established in 1921, formed the nucleus of the University of Ceylon, which came into being in 1942. The status of the Ceylon Medical College was elevated to the Faculty of Medicine of the University of Ceylon and the diploma of L.M.S. was replaced by the degree of MBBS Until it became the Faculty of Medicine, the Medical College was administered by the Civil Medical Department and its successor the Department of Medical and Sanitary Services. Dr. W.R. Kynsey served as Principal Civil Medical Officer (PCMO) between 1875 and 1897 and contributed much towards the college in its early years. Kynsey Road, which runs between the National Hospital and the Faculty, is named after him.

In 1942 the Faculty of Medicine had six Departments - Physiology, Anatomy, Pathology, Medicine, Obstetrics and Gynaecology and Surgery. Departments of Public Health (Community Medicine) and Forensic Medicine were added in 1949 and 1951 respectively. At present there are 14 Departments. The Departments of Biochemistry and Pharmacology branched off from the Department of Physiology, Parasitology and Microbiology from the Department of Pathology, and Paediatrics and Psychological Medicine from the Department of Medicine. There are 5 Units in addition to these departments - the Malaria Research Unit, the Human Genetics Unit, the Molecular Biology Unit, the Medical Education Development and Research Centre (MEDARC), and the Audio-Visual Unit. From 25 students in 1870, the student number increased to about 500 in the '60s and 1533 at present. The staff strength too has increased considerably.

Current Status 
The Faculty at present provides for the education and training of undergraduates in allied health sciences.  The course in Pharmacy is a well established one at the faculty while that for Physiotherapy is now three years old.  In addition courses ranging from medico-legal sciences to those in medical education are regularly conducted.  There is also a strong ethics review committee for processing of research projects and training of staff in ethical practices. These have provided for an innovative and vibrant academic environment within the faculty.

In the future the faculty is gearing itself for the rapid changes in the health and medical educational needs of the country.  It has taken the steps towards using advanced technologies by forward thinking. In doing so it is our (whose?) intention to establish and strengthen Inter departmental, inter faculty, inter – university and international links.

The Faculty has close links with several hospitals for teaching, training, clinical services and research. These include;
The National Hospital of Sri Lanka (Colombo General Hospital)
De Soysa Maternity Hospital (DMH)
Castle Street Hospital for Women (CSHW)
Lady Ridgeway Hospital for Children
National Eye Hospital - Sri Lanka
National Cancer Institute, Maharagama
National Institute for Mental Health, Angoda

Notable alumni
Professor Sir Nicholas Attygalle, KBE, FRCS, FRCOG - former President of the Senate of Ceylon, Vice Chancellor of University of Ceylon, Dean of the Faculty of Medicine & Professor of Obstetrics and Gynaecology
Professor Carlo Fonseka - former dean of the Faculty of Medicine, University of Kelaniya
I. M. R. A. Iriyagolle - former Minister of Education 
Sir Ratnasothy Saravanamuttu - former Mayor of Colombo
Professor Sir Sabaratnam Arulkumaran, FRCOG, FRCS - former President of the Royal College of Obstetricians and Gynaecologists (2007–2010)
Professor Sanath Lamabathusooriya, MBE - former Dean of the Medical Faculty, University of Colombo
Professor Sunitha Wickramasinghe, FRCP - Deputy Dean of the Imperial College School of Medicine and Professor of Haematology
 Deshamanya Dr P. R. Anthonis, FRCS - former Chancellor of University of Colombo
 Deshamanya Professor AH Sheriffdeen - pioneer in vascular and transplant surgery in Sri Lanka
 Vidyajyothi Professor Rezvi Sheriff, FRCP - Professor of Medicine, University of Colombo
 Professor Devaka Fernando - Professor of Medicine, University of Sri jayawardanapura
 Professor Ravindra fernando - Professor of Forensic Medicine
 Professor Harendra de Silva - Founder Chairman Child Protection Authority and Professor of Paediatrics, University of Kelaniya
Professor Tissa Vitarana - Former member of Sri Lanka Parliament 
Sudarshani Fernandopulle - Member of Sri Lanka Parliament
Lasantha Malawige - Founder Lassana Flora
Dayan Rajapaksa - Founder Chairman Esoft

Current Chairs and Heads of Departments and Special Units
Dean: Prof. Vajira Dissanayake
 
Anatomy
 Chair: Prof. Vajira Dissanayake
 Head: Prof. Vajira Dissanayake
Physiology
 Chair: Vacant
 Head: Dr. S. Wasalathanthri
Biochemistry & Molecular Biology
 Chair : Prof. Sunethra Athukorale
 Head :Dr. Kithmini Sirideva
Pathology
 Chair: Prof. Chandu de Silva
 Head: Prof. Chandu de Silva
Pharmacology & Pharmacy
 Chair: Prof. Laal Jayakody
 Head: Prof. Priyadarshani Galapptthy
Microbiology
 Chair: Prof. Jennifer Perera
 Head: Dr. Channa Senanayake
Parasitology
 Chair and Head: Prof. Nadeera Karunaweera
Community Medicine
 Chair: Prof. Dulitha Fernando.
 Head: Dr. Wasantha Gunathunga
Forensic Medicine & Toxicology
 Chair: Prof. Jean Perera
 Head: Dr. Asela Mendis
Clinical Medicine
 Chair: Prof. Saroj Jayasinghe
 Head: Prof. Godwin Constantine 
Surgery
 Chair and Head: Prof. Mandika Wijeyratne
Paediatrics
 Chair and Head: Prof. Manouri P. Senanayake
Obstetrics and Gynaecology
 Chair and Head: Prof. Harshalal Rukka Senevirathne
Psychological Medicine
 Chair: 
 Head: Prof. Raveen Hanwella
Malaria Research Unit
 Director: Prof. Nadeera Karunaweera
Human Genetics Unit
 Director: Prof. Rohan W. Jayasekera
Medical Education and Research Centre
 Director: Prof. Indika Karunaratne

Chairs of Study Streams
Introductory Basic Sciences Stream
 Chairperson: Dr. Mangala Gunathilake, Department of Physiology
Applied Sciences Stream
 Chairperson: Prof. Anuja Abeydeera, Department of Surgery
Community Stream
 Chairperson: Dr. Nalika Gunawardena, Department of Community Medicine
Behavioural Sciences Stream
 Chairperson: Prof. Wasantha Gunathunga, Department of Community Medicine
Clinical Sciences Stream
 Chairperson: Prof. Ariyaranee Gnanathasan, Department of Medicine

See also
University of Colombo

References

 A history of medicine in Sri Lanka - from the earliest time to 1948. Uragoda C G. 1987. Sri Lanka Medical Association. Colombo

https://web.archive.org/web/20100529152253/http://www.cmb.ac.lk/academic/medicine/index.htm

External links
 The Colombo Medical faculty Website
 A brief profile of the Faculty
 University of Colombo website
 The Virtual Learning Centre
 gazettes-online.co.uk

Medicine
Colombo, University of